Ciudad Guayana (in English Guyana City) is a city in Bolívar State, Venezuela. It stretches 40 kilometers along the south bank of the Orinoco river, at the point where it is joined by its main tributary, the Caroní river. The Caroni crosses the city south-north and divides it on its two main halves: the old town of San Félix in the east, and the new town of Puerto Ordaz in the west. The city was officially founded in 1961 by the unification of this two former settlements, but the history of San Félix goes back to its foundation in 1724. Within the city limits are located the site of Cachamay Falls and Llovizna Falls. There are three bridges across the Caroni and the second crossing over the Orinoco, the Orinoquia Bridge, was inaugurated in the city in 2006. With approximately one million people, it is Venezuela's fastest-growing city due to its important iron, steel, aluminium and hydroelectric industries. Ciudad Guayana is one of Venezuela's five most important ports, since most goods produced in the industry-rich Bolívar state are shipped through it, as ocean-going vessels can sail to it from the Atlantic Ocean up the Orinoco river.

Due to its planned nature, the city has a drastically different feel from many other South American cities. The towers of the Alta Vista district recall Barranquilla, and many of the residential neighborhoods have architecture and landscaping that are similar to suburbs in the United States in the 1950s, 70 and 80, including 'cookie cutter' homes, sidewalks, and patterned lawns. This is an artifact due to the presence in the 1960s and early 1970s of US Steel, an American company with iron mining operations in the region. US Steel built housing for hundreds of its American immigrant workers and families, who lived in Puerto Ordaz and other communities until the nationalization of the Venezuelan steel industry forced the company and its workers to leave.

Puerto Ordaz is one of the 2 best planned cities in all of South America, from Mexico to Cabo de Hornos,  Argentina. It was designed by the Massachusetts Institute of Technology and Harvard University. Its internal forest parks look like a fully developed country. And its avenues are extraordinarily planned. The city has a strong trade presence, who helped create it, make it grow and give it an air very different from any city in South America, since W.W.2. 

The city is very strategic for Venezuela. Many personalities have visited it during its young history, from Pope John Paul II until many former presidents, such as G.W. Bush, artists, filmmakers like Spielberg who used the city parks to make shots for movies, and others. 

Guayana City is served by Manuel Carlos Piar International Airport in Puerto Ordaz.

History 

The first explorations of Diego de Ordaz were organized in 1531. An expedition
led by Juan González Sosa discovered previously unknown jungles and plains on 
the banks of the Orinoco River. In 1535, another expedition into the region was led by Lieutenant Alfonso Herrera. It
was after the movements of conquest and colonization, when in 1591 Antonio de Berrio founded Santo Tome de Guayana at the confluence of the Caroni and Orinoco, in the country of Carapana near the Indian village of Cachamay.

The city was founded multiple times in different places, due to the continuous attacks of pirates and conquerors which destroyed it as they went down the Orinoco River in search of El Dorado.

In 1618, when he was near the old Guiana, an English expedition sent by Walter Raleigh sacked and destroyed the city entirely. In 1764, the residents were relocated to Angostura, now Ciudad Bolivar, due to the continuous attacks of English and Dutch pirates. The last foundation took place at its original site on July 2, 1961 and was called Ciudad Guayana. West of the city is the Matanzas Industrial Zone, the urban area of Puerto Ordaz in the middle east and San Felix.

For the design and city planning Corporacion Venezolana de Guayana 
requested the participation of the then Harvard–MIT Joint Center for Urban Studies (USA). The
large and extensive program of building highways and avenues, 
residential areas, schools, hospitals and recreational facilities, 
continues with the same intensity since its inception, ready to house 2.5
million people in 2020. Since 1961, the city has been known as one of the fastest growing in the world.

Ciudad Guayana and the surrounding site have special interest to visitors. Within
the city, the Caroni park consisting of parks Drizzle, Cachamay and 
Loefling, which are a representative sample of the majesty and beauty of
the Rio Caroni. Other amusement park attractions include the Foundation
and Paseo Malecon San Felix. For
those interested in the basic industries of Venezuela some of these 
have a visitation schedule that could be found through their respective 
managements of Public Relations. Nearby,
less than 100 kilometers away it is Ciudad Bolívar, the historic site of Bolivar state. On the other side of the river is the 
Mission of Caroni (Caroni ruins), the Castillos de Guayana and forest 
plantations.

The Puerto Ordaz area was built and planned by the Companies Orinoco Mining Company and the Venezuelan Corporation of Guayana in the mid-twentieth century.

The November 13, 2006 the Orinoco bridge, the second largest in the country, which facilitates communications Ciudad Guayana with the opposite bank of the Orinoco River in Anzoategui and Monagas states opened.

Economic activity
Many of Venezuela's prime industries are based in Puerto Ordaz. These include Alcasa, Venalum, Bauxilum, Carbonorca (primary aluminium manufacturers and anode suppliers for the aluminium industry), Ferrominera (iron ore processing), and Sidor (Orinoco Steelmaking). The country's main electricity producer, Corpoelec, and the regional development office, CVG (Corporación Venezolana de Guayana), are also located in Puerto Ordaz..

Port
The port of Puerto Ordaz in a combination of piers (muelles), all under the control of CVG, of which only one is allocated for public use. The others are directly related to the CVG production companies, in principal all aluminium-related, approximately nine piers in total. One of the most frequently used piers is Ferrominera at the mouth of the Caroni river. Another is Ternium Sidor (recently nationalised into a CVG company, and the only steel works) at mile 197.

Hydroelectricity
The city hosts the headquarters of CVG Electrificación del Caroní (CVG Edelca), Venezuela's main electricity producer, which manage several hydroelectric power plants along the Caroní river basin. Two of them, Macagua and Caruachi, are located within city limits. The easy of access to Macagua from the city center makes it a tourist and educational destination, and a public park and museum were added to the complex.

Edelca also builds and administers two more dams upstream from the city: Tocoma and Guri. The latter is currently (as of 2018) the fourth-biggest hydroelectric power station in the world in terms of generation capacity, and gave origin to the Guri reservoir, the second biggest lake in Venezuela.

Transportation

Puerto Ordaz is crisscrossed from north to south and east to west by numerous avenues. Some of them are:
Guayana Avenue is the main traffic avenue of the city, since it crisscrosses the city from its start to its end. It begins at the toll on the "Ciudad Bolívar-Ciudad Guayana" Highway, and goes all the way through Puerto Ordaz (industrial zone, airport, commercial zone, residential zone, even the touristic zone since it side passes the Cachamay Park).
Atlántico Avenue runs through Puerto Ordaz from west to east on the south side of the city. It intersects with the Las Americas avenue and the Leopoldo Sucre Figarella avenue. This gives a high importance to this avenue.
Las Américas Avenue connects the Altavista sector (north of the city) with the centre.
Paseo Caroní Avenue starts on the west side of the city and ends at the Atlantic avenue.

On December 3, 2006, the Orinokia bridge, which crosses the Orinoco river, was inaugurated.

The area is served by Manuel Carlos Piar Guayana Airport.

Recreation

In Puerto Ordaz the principal recreation centers are:
Natural: Llovizna park, Cachamay park, Loefling park.
Shopping centers: Orinokia Mall, Altavista Mall, Atlántico Mall.
Family: Macagua Eco Museum, Christmas Park and the Italian-Venezuelan Club.

Ciudad Guayana is home to two football clubs that play in the Venezuelan Primera División, namely LALA FC and Mineros de Guayana. Both clubs play their home games in the CTE Cachamay stadium, which also hosts games of the national team and numerous concerts.

Notable people

Kervin Andrade (born 2005), Venezuelan footballer
Eugenio Suárez (born 1991), Major League Baseball player

Education

Puerto Ordaz is also well known for having one of the best engineering schools in Latin America. The main universities are:

Regional hubs:
 Andrés Bello UCAB (Catholic University) 
 UDO (East University)
 Gran Mariscal de Ayacucho (UGMA) University
 Bicentenaria de Aragua (UBA) University

Puerto Ordaz is headquarters of colleges like:

 UNEXPO (National Experimental Polytechnic University)
 UNEG (National Experimental University of Guayana)

Technical Institutes
 U.E.E.T.I. Fundación "La Salle" (San Félix)
 I.U.T. Antonio José de Sucre 
 I.U.T. Pedro Emilio Coll
 I.U.P. Santiago Mariño

Tourism

Inside the city both the Llovizna and Cachamay Parks are located displaying their picturesque waterfalls. Other local attractions are the Caroní Ecomuseum located at the Macagua Dam. Near the city from the Angosturita bridge to the San Félix port the union of the Caroní and Orinoco rivers can be seen; the different colors of the water of both rivers make a very distinct demarcation line. Taking Puerto Ordaz as a starting point, the Orinoco Delta can be visited as well as Canaima's National Park and Guri's reservoirs. Other points of interest are the colonial castles at the Orinoco riverside and the "Cerro del Elefante" (Elephant's hill) which can be reached in a 4x4 vehicle. The Castles of Guayana are located at the right side of the Orinoco River, about 35 kilometers from San Félix.

Hotels
 Intercontinental Guayana Hotel
 Rasil Hotel
 Mara Inn Best Western Hotel
 Embajador Hotel
 Dos Ríos Hotel
 Eurobuilding
 Posada Turistica Residencias Tore

Gallery

See also 

Venezuela
Bolívar State
List of cities in Venezuela
Railway stations in Venezuela

References

External links 

 "Guayana City, (Puerto Ordaz & San Felix)" VenezuelaTuya, photographs of the city
 "La Guayana de Antaño", History in Pictures
 BBC article in a Puerto Ordaz aluminium plant

 
Populated places in Bolívar (state)
Populated places established in 1961
Planned cities
1961 establishments in Venezuela
Urban planning in Venezuela
Port cities in Venezuela